The News-Gazette is a local newspaper serving Winchester and Union City, Indiana, as well as parts of Ohio. Its publisher is Leesa Friend, and it is edited by Brian Pogue. It is published bi-weekly on Tuesdays and Thursdays each week by Community Media Group Inc. It has a circulation of approximately 2,300 copies.

During the 1990s, the paper changed hands multiple times, being bought by Park Communications in 1988, which sold it in 1994 to Donald Tomlin and Gary Knapp. Knapp and Tomlin sold it in turn to Media General.

See also 
 List of newspapers in Indiana

References

External links 
 Official website

Newspapers published in Indiana